Larry Allan Simpson (born August 26, 1977) is a former baseball pitcher. Simpson has pitched in the majors for the Cincinnati Reds, Colorado Rockies, and Milwaukee Brewers of Major League Baseball.

Career
Simpson made his Major League debut on May 17, . On July 7, 2008 Simpson signed a minor league contract with the Philadelphia Phillies. Simpson retired at the end of the season.

External links
, or Retrosheet, or Pelota Binaria (Venezuelan Winter League)

1977 births
Living people
Arizona League Mariners players
Baseball players from Illinois
Cardenales de Lara players
American expatriate baseball players in Venezuela
Cincinnati Reds players
Colorado Rockies players
Colorado Springs Sky Sox players
Everett AquaSox players
Lancaster JetHawks players
Louisville Bats players
Major League Baseball pitchers
Mesa Solar Sox players
Milwaukee Brewers players
Nashville Sounds players
Reading Phillies players
San Antonio Missions players
San Bernardino Stampede players
Sioux City Explorers players
Sportspeople from Springfield, Illinois
Tacoma Rainiers players
Taft Cougars baseball players
Wisconsin Timber Rattlers players